Proshaberd (also Boloraberd) is a fortress built in the 13th century by Prince Prosh Khaghbakian. Almost one kilometer east is the 14th century Spitakavor Church dedicated to Saint Astvatsatsin.

Folklore of Proshaberd
Local folklore tells that long ago the Persians besieged the fortress of Proshaberd which had very strong walls and its own water supply that led to the structure. Due to its impenetrable walls they were not successful, and after several attempts at trying to bring the fortress down they decided to cut off its water supply.  Soldiers were unsuccessfully able to locate it, so the leader was advised by one of his men to keep a mule thirsty for seven days and nights and then to let it go for it will search for water. The recommendation was heeded, and after seven days and nights the mule was let free. It went on to search for water, and went precisely to the area where the water supply that led to the fortress was located and started to dig. The Persian army was then able to cut the water supply off, which in turn caused the fortress to surrender.

Prince Prosh fearing possible attacks in the near future is said to have hid his valuables within the walls of Proshaberd and in the nearby mountains and ravines. It is said that, "If one can understand the symbols left by Prince Prosh, then they may possibly locate his lost treasures." A khachkar that sits alone near the road strangely reads, "The treasure is in the head."

References 
 
 

Archaeological sites in Armenia
Castles in Armenia
Forts in Armenia
Buildings and structures in Vayots Dzor Province
Tourist attractions in Vayots Dzor Province